William B. Lentz (May 14, 1920 – September 18, 1977) is an American politician from Pennsylvania who served as a Republican member of the Pennsylvania State Senate for the 15th district  from 1965 to 1976.

Biography
Lentz was born on May 14, 1920, in Millersburg, Pennsylvania to Charles Warren and Minnie (Reigle) Lentz, the fifth child of their seven children.

Along with four of his six brothers, Staff Sgt. William B. Lentz served in the U.S. Army in World War II.

He defeated M. Harvey Taylor, the President pro tempore of the Pennsylvania Senate, to serve as a member of the Pennsylvania Senate for the 15th district from 1965 to 1976.

He died on September 18, 1977, in Harrisburg, Pennsylvania and is interred at Oak Hill Cemetery in Millersburg, Pennsylvania.

See also
Politics of the United States

References

1920 births
1977 deaths
20th-century American politicians
United States Army personnel of World War II
Burials in Pennsylvania
Republican Party Pennsylvania state senators
People from Dauphin County, Pennsylvania